Pavia di Udine (Friulian: Pavie) is a comune (municipality) in  the Italian region Friuli-Venezia Giulia, located about  northwest of Trieste and about  southeast of Udine.

Pavia di Udine borders the following municipalities: Bicinicco, Buttrio, Manzano, Mortegliano, Pozzuolo del Friuli, Pradamano, Santa Maria la Longa, Trivignano Udinese, Udine.

References

External links
 Official website

Cities and towns in Friuli-Venezia Giulia